Folau Niua (born January 27, 1985) is an American rugby union former player. He played fly-half for the United States national rugby sevens team from 2011 to 2022, and holds the U.S. record for most tournament appearances with over 65 caps.

Early career
Folau Niua is from East Palo Alto in California, and attended high school at Woodside High. Niua previously played his club rugby with the East Palo Alto Razorbacks, where he helped the club win the 2009 Division II national championship. He then played with San Francisco Golden Gate, where he helped the team win the 2011 Rugby Super League national championship. Niua played in the August 2011 national all-star championships, where his impressive scoring ability and fitness led the Pacific Coast team.

Rugby career

U.S. national team (7s)
Niua debuted for the United States national sevens team at the 2011 Pan American Games, where, despite his lack of international tournament experience, he was the starting flyhalf. Niua was the top scorer for the U.S. in that tournament with 41 points, including a 78% success rate in kicking his conversions, helping the U.S. achieve a bronze medal.

Niua signed a professional contract with USA Rugby in January 2012 to play full-time for the U.S. national sevens team. Niua was a regular on the U.S. national team in the 2011–12 IRB Sevens World Series, finishing the season as one of the leading scorers for the team. Niua also played for the U.S. during the 2012–13 IRB Sevens World Series, leading the team with 30 points at the 2012 South Africa Sevens. Niua also played for the U.S. during the 2016 Summer Olympics.

U.S. national team (15s) 

Niua had been in consideration for a place at the 2011 Rugby World Cup, but ultimately did not make the tournament roster. Niua made the roster for the 2015 Rugby World Cup where he played as a center.

Professional career
In February 2014, Niua signed a contract with the Glasgow Warriors. Niua was released by Glasgow at the end of the season having made only one appearance for the club.

References

External links
 
 
 
 
 

American rugby union players
United States international rugby union players
1985 births
Living people
Sportspeople from Palo Alto, California
United States international rugby sevens players
Glasgow Warriors players
Olympic rugby sevens players of the United States
Rugby sevens players at the 2016 Summer Olympics
Pan American Games medalists in rugby sevens
Pan American Games bronze medalists for the United States
Rugby sevens players at the 2011 Pan American Games
Medalists at the 2011 Pan American Games
Rugby sevens players at the 2020 Summer Olympics